The 1997 Danamon Open was a women's tennis tournament played on outdoor hard courts at the Gelora Senayan Stadium in Jakarta, Indonesia and was part of the Tier IV category of the 1997 WTA Tour. It was the fifth and last edition of the tournament and was held from April 22 through April 27, 1997. Second-seeded Naoko Sawamatsu won the singles title.

Finals

Singles

 Naoko Sawamatsu defeated  Yuka Yoshida 6–3, 6–2
 It was Sawamatsu's only title of the year and the 4th of her career.

Doubles

 Kerry-Anne Guse /  Kristine Radford defeated  Lenka Němečková /  Yuka Yoshida 6–4, 5–7, 7–5
 It was Guse's 1st title of the year and the 4th of her career. It was Radford's 1st title of the year and the 5th of her career.

External links
 ITF tournament edition details
 Tournament draws

Danamon Open
Danamon Open
Danamon Open
Danamon Open